The 1700s BC was a decade lasting from January 1, 1709 BC to December 31, 1700 BC.

Events and trends
 c. 1700 BC – The last woolly mammoth goes extinct on Wrangel Island.
 c. 1700 BC – The city of Knossos on Crete is destroyed by fire.
 c. 1700 BC – Aegean metalworkers begin producing crafts that rival those of the ancient Near East, whose techniques they seem to borrow.
 c. 1700 BC – The Indus Valley civilization comes to an end and the Cemetery H culture begins.
 c. 1700 BC – Lila-Ir-Tash starts ruling the Elamite Empire.
 c. 1700 BC – Bronze Age starts in China.
 c. 1700 BC – The Oxus civilization ends in today's Central Asia.
c. 1700 BC – Meteor explosion produces Middle Ghor Event: Catastrophic Termination of a Bronze Age Civilization

Significant people
 Jie of Xia, last ruler of the Xia Dynasty, begins ruling around 1706 BC
 Lila-Ir-Tash, king of the Elamite Empire
 Rim-Sin I, king of the city-state of Larsa
 Hammurabi, king of Babylon (according to the short chronology)

References

18th century BC